Francis Adams may refer to:

Francis Adams (translator) (1796–1861), Scottish medical doctor and translator of Greek medical works
Francis Adams (writer) (1862–1893), English essayist, poet, dramatist, novelist and journalist
Francis Adams (athlete) (1953–1987), sprinter from Trinidad and Tobago 
Francis Colburn Adams (1850–1891), American miscellaneous writer
Francis Ottiwell Adams (1825–1889), British diplomat
Francis W. H. Adams (1904–1990), New York City Police Commissioner, 1954–1955
Francis Adams (cricketer) (1835–1911), Australian cricketer

See also
Frank Adams (disambiguation)
Adams (surname)